Massimo Livi Bacci (November 9, 1936) is an Italian professor of Demography, School of Political Science “Cesare Alfieri,” University of Florence and Department of Statistics, Computing, Applications “Giuseppe Parenti”.

Early life and education
Livi Bacci was born in Florence. In 1960, he graduated from the Faculty of Political Science “Cesare Alfieri” of the University of Florence. In 1960-61 he studied at Brown University, supported by a Fulbright scholarship.

Academic career

In 1962 Livi Bacci began working in the University of Rome. In 1966 he became a full professor of Demography in the Faculty of Economics, University of Florence. In 1984 he was a professor in Demography in the Faculty of Political Science “Cesare Alfieri”, also the University of Florence.

Livi Bacci has spent periods teaching and conducting research about various aspects of demographics in the United States, Mexico, Brazil, and various European countries. His research has included studies on the effects of famine, disease, and culture on fertility rates and population changes. He has also studied methods of predicting future population growth.

Livi Bacci has written many books and articles about various topics related to population growth, decline, and migration.  He is known for having developed the concept of "mortality crisis."
 
Livi Bacci was elected to the American Philosophical Society in 2004. As of 2015, he is a Professor Emeritus of the University of Florence.

Political career

Livi Bacci was elected to the Italian Senate twice from Toscana: April, 2006 and April 2008.

References

External links
Massimo Livi Bacci'', Personal page on the web site of Universita Degli Studi Firenze

1936 births
Living people
Brown University alumni
Academic staff of the University of Florence
Members of the American Philosophical Society